Zhengding, originally Zhending and alternately romanized as Chengting is a town in and being the seat of Zhengding County, in southwestern Hebei province, China, located just to the north of Shijiazhuang, the provincial capital, in between China National Highway 107 and G4 Beijing–Hong Kong and Macau Expressway. , it has 13 residential communities and 49 villages under its administration.

See also
List of township-level divisions of Hebei

References

Township-level divisions of Hebei